Sergeant John A. Davidsizer (April 26, 1834 – October 19, 1913) was an American soldier who fought in the American Civil War. Davidsizer received the country's highest award for bravery during combat, the Medal of Honor, for his action at Paines Crossroads, Virginia on 5 April 1865. He was honored with the award on 3 May 1865.

Biography
Davidsizer was born in Milford, Pennsylvania on 26 April 1834. He enlisted into the 1st Pennsylvania Cavalry. He died on 19 October 1913 and his remains are interred at the First Methodist Cemetery in Lewistown, Pennsylvania.

Medal of Honor citation

See also

List of American Civil War Medal of Honor recipients: A–F

References

1834 births
1913 deaths
People of Pennsylvania in the American Civil War
Union Army officers
United States Army Medal of Honor recipients
American Civil War recipients of the Medal of Honor